Fritillaria micrantha, the brown fritillary or brown bells, is a Californian species of flowering plant in the lily family Liliaceae.

Description 
The long, straight, very narrow leaves grow in whorls about the lower stem and in pairs near the top. The stem has one or more pendent, nodding flowers at each node. They are variable in appearance but are usually purplish to greenish-yellow and often mottled or edged with color. The fruit capsule is winged.

Distribution
This wildflower is native to the Sierra Nevada of California, USA, where it is a common resident of dry mountain slopes, and to the foothills west of the main range. There is also one report of the species in the Diablo Range in San Benito County.

References

External links
Jepson Manual Treatment - Fritillaria micrantha
United States Department of Agriculture Plants Profile; Fritillaria micrantha
Fritillaria micrantha - Calphotos, University of California @ Berkeley, Photo gallery

micrantha
Endemic flora of California
Plants described in 1857
Flora of the Sierra Nevada (United States)
Flora without expected TNC conservation status